Bernardin Pavlović was a Franciscan writer from Dubrovnik, born in Ston. He had two works printed in Venice in 1747 which he wrote were "in Croatian". The title of the second work notes it's printed in "our worthy Croatian language" for "the use of the Croatian people", which was noticed by Vatroslav Jagić and later by John V. A. Fine as one of increasingly many examples of how the term Croatian came into use in addition to the existing more generic Illyrian (Slavic) terminology in Dalmatia.

See also
 Republic of Ragusa
 List of notable Ragusans
 Dubrovnik
 Dalmatia
 History of Dalmatia

References

Bibliography
 

Croatian Franciscans
18th-century Croatian Roman Catholic priests
Ragusan clergy
Year of death unknown
Year of birth unknown
People from Ston